Troubles of the Brain is the first EP by the Veils, out on 24 January 2011 on Pitch Beast Records. Finn Andrews set up his own label to release the Veils' first EP after leaving Rough Trade after almost 9 years. It was recorded at Andrews' home studio in London, and produced by Andrews and Bernard Butler. The first single from the EP was "The Stars Came Out Once the Lights Went Out".

Track listing

CD  (PITCD001) 
"Bloom"
"Don't Let the Same Bee Sting You Twice"
"The Stars Came Out Once the Lights Went Out"
"The Wishbone"
"Grey Lynn Park"
"Us Godless Teenagers"
"Iodine and Iron (Bonus Track)"

The EP possibly takes its name from Act 5 Scene 3 of William Shakespeare's Macbeth.

MACBETH
"Cure her of that.Canst thou not minister to a mind diseased,
Pluck from the memory a rooted sorrow,Raze out the written troubles of the brainAnd with some sweet oblivious antidoteCleanse the stuff'd bosom of that perilous stuffWhich weighs upon the heart?"

References

2011 debut EPs
The Veils albums